The Copa ASOBAL is an annual handball cup competition for Liga ASOBAL teams. It was first played for in 1990 and is contested by the top four teams at the end of the first half of the Liga ASOBAL season.

Season by season

Titles by team

External links 
 

 
2
Recurring sporting events established in 1990
Liga ASOBAL